Sándor Nagy (born 24 September 1960) is a Hungarian former swimmer. He competed at the 1976 Summer Olympics and the 1980 Summer Olympics.

References

External links
 

1960 births
Living people
Hungarian male swimmers
Olympic swimmers of Hungary
Swimmers at the 1976 Summer Olympics
Swimmers at the 1980 Summer Olympics
People from Gyula
Sportspeople from Békés County
20th-century Hungarian people
21st-century Hungarian people